James Patrick Clements (born March 11, 1964) is the 15th president of Clemson University in Clemson, South Carolina. He assumed office on December 31, 2013, after being president of West Virginia University for five years. Prior to his presidency, he was the provost and vice president of academic affairs for Towson University.

Early life
Clements is a graduate of Randallstown High School in Randallstown, Maryland. He earned a B.S. in Computer Science from the University of Maryland, Baltimore County and an M.S. in Computer Science from Johns Hopkins University. He then returned to UMBC where he earned an M.S. and Ph.D. in Operations Analysis.

Towson University and West Virginia University

Previous to assuming presidency at Clemson University, Clements was the vice president of academic affairs for Towson University and president of West Virginia University. At Towson, he held many positions including Robert W. Deutsch Distinguished Professor of Information Technology; Chair, Department of Computer and Information Sciences; and Executive Director, Center for Applied Information Technology. He was a consultant to many private companies during his career at Towson.

Clements served as president for nearly five years at West Virginia University. During his presidency, WVU set many records in private fundraising, research funding, applications and enrollment. WVU grew and developed under Clements through partnerships; he made nearly $1.5 billion worth of capital improvements on campus, and around the community.

Clemson University
Clements became the 15th President of Clemson University on December 31, 2013.  In addition to his responsibilities as President of the University he holds a joint appointment as Professor in the School of Computing and Professor in the Department of Industrial Engineering.

Under the leadership of President Clements, Clemson has reached several milestones including: the largest campus facilities development initiative in university history, a record number of student applications with the strongest academic profile ever, and an 80% increase in private fundraising since 2014. President Clements has helped to raise more than $1.5 billion in private funds at Clemson University. Combined, his fundraising efforts at both Clemson and WVU totals more than $2.3 billion.

In addition to his role as president, Clements  served as Chair of the Board of Directors for the Association of Public and Land-grant Universities (APLU) in 2015. He also served as chair of the American Council on Education (ACE) Commission on Leadership; co-chaired the U.S. Department of Commerce's National Advisory Council on Innovation and Entrepreneurship; and served on the executive committee of the APLU's Commission on Innovation, Competitiveness and Economic Prosperity. He also serves on the ACE board and the Executive Committee for both the Council on Competitiveness and the Board for the Business Higher Education Forum. He is also the only university president to ever serve on the U.S. Department of Commerce Innovation Advisory Board.

Clements' book, Successful Project Management, is now in its 7th edition and is published in multiple languages and used in numerous countries.

Personal life
Clements married his wife, Elisabeth Smith Clements, on December 29, 1990. Dr. Clements and Beth have four children.

Their daughter Grace has apraxia, a neurological speech disorder. In 2010 Beth Clements’ parents, Clifton and Priscilla Smith, donated $25,000 to West Virginia University in their granddaughter's name for research, they established the Grace Clements Speech Pathology and Audiology Research Endowment. At Clemson, Beth is a member of the advisory board for ClemsonLIFE, a program designed to help young adults with special needs. In 2015, the Clemson Board of Visitors established the Grace Clements Scholarship Endowment to provide financial assistance to ClemsonLIFE students. Clements and Beth contributed $100,000 to the endowment named for their youngest daughter.

References

1964 births
Living people
University of Maryland, Baltimore County alumni
Johns Hopkins University alumni
Presidents of Clemson University
Presidents of West Virginia University
Towson University faculty